The 2019 European Beach Volleyball Championship were held in Moscow, Russia from 5–11 August 2019.

References

External links
Official website

European Beach Volleyball Championships
European Beach Volleyball
European Beach Volleyball
International volleyball competitions hosted by Russia
European Beach Volleyball
Sports competitions in Moscow
2019 in Moscow